The  (abbreviated OKW) was the high command of the armed forces of Nazi Germany. Created in 1938, the OKW replaced the Reich War Ministry and had oversight over the individual high commands of the country's armed forces: the army, navy, and air force.

Rivalry with the different services' commands, mainly with the Army High Command (OKH), prevented the OKW from becoming a unified German General Staff in an effective chain of command, though it did help coordinate operations between the three services. During the war, the OKW acquired more and more operational powers. By 1942, the OKW had responsibility for all theatres except for the Eastern Front. However, Adolf Hitler manipulated the system in order to prevent any one command from taking a dominant role in decision making. This "divide and conquer" method helped put most military decisions in Hitler's own hands, which at times included even those affecting engagements at the battalion level, a practice which, due to bureaucratic delays and Hitler's worsening indecision as the war progressed, would eventually contribute to Germany's defeat.

Genesis
The OKW was established by executive decree on 4 February 1938, in the aftermath of the Blomberg-Fritsch affair, which had led to the dismissal of the Commander-in-Chief of the Armed Forces and head of the Reich War Ministry, Werner von Blomberg, as well as the Commander-in-Chief of the Army, Werner von Fritsch.

Adolf Hitler, who had been waiting for an opportunity to gain personal control over the German military, quickly took advantage of the scandal, using the powers granted to him by the Enabling Act to do so. The decree dissolved the ministry and replaced it with the High Command of the Armed Forces (Oberkommando der Wehrmacht).

The OKW was led by Field Marshal Wilhelm Keitel as Chief of the OKW with the rank of a Reich Minister, which essentially made him the second most powerful person in the armed forces' hierarchy after Hitler. The next officer after Keitel was Lieutenant-General Alfred Jodl, who served as the OKW's Chief of Operations Staff. However, despite this seemingly powerful hierarchy, the German military's officers mostly disregarded Keitel's position, deeming him nothing more than Hitler's lackey. Other officers often had direct access to the Führer, such as officers with the rank of field marshal, while other officers even outranked Keitel, an example being the Commander-in-Chief of the Air Force, Hermann Göring. This position ideally meant Göring was subordinate to Keitel, but his alternate rank of Reichsmarschall made him the second most powerful person in Germany after Hitler, and he used this alternate power to circumvent Keitel and access Hitler directly whenever he wished.

By June 1938, the OKW comprised four departments:
  (WFA; initially , renamed  (Wfst) in August 1940) – operations staff. Chief: Colonel General Alfred Jodl, 1 September 1939 – 8 May 1945
  (WFA/L) a subdepartment through which all details of operational planning were worked out, and from which all operational orders were communicated to the OKW. Chief: Major General Walter Warlimont, 1 September 1939 – 6 September 1944; Major General Horst Freiherr Treusch von Buttlar-Brandenfels, 6 September 1944 – 30 November 1944; General August Winter, 1 December 1944 – 23 April 1945
 Wehrmacht Propaganda Troops: its function was to produce and disseminate propaganda materials aimed at the German troops and the population. Commanded by General Hasso von Wedel (1 September 1939 – 8 May 1945), the department oversaw the numerous propaganda companies of the Wehrmacht and the Waffen-SS, attached to the fighting troops. At its peak in 1942, the propaganda troops included 15,000 men.
  –  army staff. Chief: General Walther Buhle, 15 February 1942 – 8 May 1945
  –  Chief of Staff, Wehrmacht signal corps
  – foreign intelligence
  – central department. Chief: Major General Hans Oster, 1 September 1939 – January 1944
  – foreign. Chief: Admiral Leopold Bürkner, 15 June 1938 -
  – intelligence. Chief: Colonel Hans Piekenbrock, 1 September 1939 – March 1943; Colonel Georg Hansen, March 1943 – February 1944
  – special service. Chief: Colonel Erwin von Lahousen, 1 September 1939 – July 1943; Colonel Wessel Freytag von Loringhoven, July 1943 – June 1944
  – counter-intelligence. Chief: Colonel , 1 March 1941 -
  – foreign communications
  – supply matters
  – miscellaneous matters
  – information centre for war casualties and prisoners of war

Hitler promoted Keitel to Chief of the OKW, i.e. Chief of the Armed Forces High Command. As head of the WFA, Keitel appointed  although after two months he was removed from command, and this post was not refilled until the promotion of Alfred Jodl. These changes were largely cosmetic however as key staff remained in post and continued to fulfill the same duties.

Leadership
Chief of the OKW

Chief of Operations Staff

Operations
Officially, the OKW served as the military general staff for the Third Reich, coordinating the efforts of the army, navy, and air Force. In practice, however, Hitler used OKW as his personal military staff, translating his ideas into military orders, such as the Führer Directives, and issuing them to the three services while having little control over them. However, as the war progressed, the OKW found itself exercising increasing amounts of direct command authority over military units, particularly in the west. This created a situation such that by 1942, the OKW held the de facto command of western forces while the Army High Command directly controlled the Eastern Front. It was not until 28 April 1945 (two days before his suicide) that Hitler placed the OKH directly under the OKW, finally giving the latter full command of Germany's armed forces.

True to his strategy of setting different parts of the Nazi bureaucracy to compete for his favor in areas where their administration overlapped, Hitler ensured there was a rivalry between the OKW and the OKH. Since most German operations during World War II were army-controlled (with  support), the OKH demanded control over German military forces. Nevertheless, Hitler decided against the OKH in favor of the OKW overseeing operations in many land theaters, despite being the head of the OKH. As the war progressed, more and more influence moved from the OKH to the OKW, with Norway being the first "OKW war theater". More and more areas came under complete control of the OKW. Finally, only the Eastern Front remained the domain of the OKH. However, as the Eastern Front was by far the primary battlefield of the German military, the OKH was still influential.

The OKW ran military operations on the Western front, in North Africa, and in Italy.

Further complications in OKW operations also arose in circumstances such as when, on 19 December 1941, Hitler dismissed Walther von Brauchitsch as Commander-in-Chief of the Army, after the failure of the Battle of Moscow, and assumed von Brauchitsch's former position, in essence reporting directly to himself, since the Commander-in-Chief of the Army reported to the Supreme Commander of the Armed Forces.

In Berlin and Königsberg, the German Army had large Fernschreibstelle (teleprinter offices) which collected morning messages each day from regional or local centres. They also had a Geheimschreibstube or cipher room where plaintext messages could be encrypted on  Lorenz SZ40/42 machines. If sent by radio rather than landline they were intercepted and decrypted at Bletchley Park in England, where they were known as Fish. Some messages were daily returns, and some were between Hitler and his generals; both were valuable to Allied intelligence.

International Military Tribunal
During the Nuremberg trials, the OKW was indicted but acquitted of being a criminal organization because of Article 9 of the charter of the International Military Tribunal.

Despite this, both Keitel and Jodl were convicted of war crimes and sentenced to death by hanging.

During the subsequent High Command Trial in 1947-48, fourteen Wehrmacht officers were charged with war crimes, especially for the Commissar Order to execute Soviet political commissars in occupied territories in the east, the killing of POWs, and participation in the Holocaust. Eleven defendants received prison sentences ranging from three years, including time served, to lifetime imprisonment; two were acquitted on all counts and one committed suicide during the trial.

See also
Cipher Department of the High Command of the Wehrmacht

Notes

References

Citations

Bibliography
Printed

 
 
 
 
 
 

Online

Further reading
 Hayward, Joel, Adolf Hitler and Joint Warfare (Upper Hutt: Military Studies Institute, 2000).
 Seaton, A. The German Army, 1939–1945 (St. Martin's Press, 1982)
 Stone, David. Twilight of the Gods: The Decline and Fall of the German General Staff in World War II (2011). 
 Wilt, A. War from the Top: German and British Decision Making During World War II (Indiana U. Press, 1990)

External links
"Not the Stuff of Legend: The German High Command in World War II" – lecture by Dr. Geoffrey Megargee, author of Inside Hitler's High Command, available at the official YouTube channel U.S. Army Heritage and Education Center

Military units and formations established in 1938
Wehrmacht
1938 establishments in Germany
German High Command during World War II